The 2020–21 Oklahoma Sooners basketball team represented the University of Oklahoma in the 2020–21 NCAA Division I men's basketball season. They were led by 10th-year head coach Lon Kruger and played their home games at the Lloyd Noble Center in Norman, Oklahoma, as members of the Big 12 Conference. They finished the season 16–11, 9–8 in Big 12 play to finish in a tie for sixth place. As the No. 7 seed in the Big 12 tournament, they defeated Iowa State before losing to Kansas in the quarterfinals. They received an at-large bid to the NCAA tournament as the No. 8 seed in the West region. There they defeated Missouri in the First Round before losing to Gonzaga in the Second Round.

On March 25, 2021, head coach Lon Kruger retired as head coach after 10 years at Oklahoma and 45 years of coaching. On April 3, the school named Loyola coach Porter Moser the new head coach.

Previous season
The Sooners finished the 2019–20 season with an overall record of 19–11, 9–9 in Big 12 play to finish in a tie for third place. All postseason tournaments were canceled due to the ongoing COVID-19 pandemic.

Offseason

Departures

Incoming transfers

2020 recruiting class

Roster

Schedule and results

|-
! colspan=9 style=|Regular season

|-
! colspan=9 style=| Big 12 Tournament

|-
! colspan=9 style=| NCAA tournament

|-

Source

References

Oklahoma
Oklahoma Sooners men's basketball seasons
Oklahoma